El Dragón is Spanish for "dragon".  It may refer to:

El Dragón, a 2003 album by Johnny Prez
El Dragón: Return of a Warrior, a Spanish-language crime drama television series
Francis Drake, who earned the nickname for his privateering efforts in the Spanish Main during the 16th century